Jiang Weilang (born 5 August 2002) is a Chinese footballer who plays as a defender.

Club career
Born in Hubei, Jiang started at the Evergrande Football School in Guangdong, before joining Guangzhou. After one Chinese FA Cup appearance for Guangzhou, Wu moved to Spain to join Sporting de Gijón, alongside teammates He Xinjie and Wu Junjie. In his first season, he was loaned to affiliate club Llanera in the Segunda División RFEF.

After failing to make an impact in Spain, his contract was terminated at the end of 2021, and he returned to China, re-joining Guangzhou in mid-2022.

Career statistics

Club
.

References

2002 births
Living people
Chinese footballers
China youth international footballers
Association football defenders
Guangzhou F.C. players
Sporting de Gijón players
Sporting de Gijón B players
Chinese expatriate footballers
Chinese expatriate sportspeople in Spain
Expatriate footballers in Spain